Thompson River is the largest tributary of the Fraser River, flowing through the south-central portion of British Columbia, Canada.

Thompson River may also refer to:

Canada
 Thompson River (Notawassi Lake tributary), a river in Lac-Douaire (unorganized territory), MRC Antoine-Labelle, Laurentides (administrative region), Quebec
 Thompson River (De Montigny Lake tributary), a tributary of the Milky River in Quebec; see List of rivers of Quebec#Quebec rivers flowing in Ontario (or tributaries of Ontario rivers)
 Thompson River (Franquelin River tributary), a tributary of the Franquelin River in Franquelin, Manicouagan, Côte-Nord, Quebec
 Thompson River Salish, the northern branch of the Thompson River in British Columbia

United-States
 Thompson River (Missouri)
 Thompson River (Montana)
 Little Thompson River (Montana), a tributary of Thompson River, Montana
 Big Thompson River, a tributary of South Platte River, in the U.S. state of Colorado
 Little Thompson River, a tributary of Big Thompson River

See also 
 Thompson River Salish, a name for the Nlaka'pamux, a Canadian First Nation
 Thompson River Salish language, a name for Nlaka'pamuctsin also known as Nlaka'pamux, an Interior Salishan language spoken in the Canadian province of British Columbia
 Thompson Rivers University, Kamloops, British Columbia, Canada